This article presents top ten lists of female singles tennis players, as ranked by various official and non-official ranking authorities throughout the history of the sport.

The article is split into two sections: 1921–1974, and since 1975 when the first official WTA rankings were published, for ease of navigation.

Top ten rankings by year

1921

1922

1923

1924

1925

1926

1927

1928

1929

1930

1931

1932

1933

1934

1935

1936

1937

1938 
 Last ranking by Wallis Myers before his death.

1939

1940–1945 
no world rankings (World War II)

1946

1947

1948

1949

1950 
 Last Olliff ranking before his death.

1951

1952

1953

1954

1955

1956

1957

1958

1959

1960

1961

1962

1963

1964

1965 
 Last ranking by Potter for World Tennis magazine.

1966

1967 
 The last British Lawn Tennis readers' poll.

1968

1969

1970

1971

1972

1973

1974

1975–present

See also 
 World number 1 ranked female tennis players
 List of WTA number 1 ranked singles tennis players
 Top ten ranked male tennis players
 Top ten ranked male tennis players (1912–1972)

Notes

References 

Women's tennis
10
10